Entomogramma is a genus of moths of the family Noctuidae. The genus was erected by Achille Guenée in 1852.

Description
Palpi with second joint thickened and reaching vertex of head, and moderate length third joint. Thorax and abdomen smoothly scaled. Fore tibia of male fringed with long hair. Mid and hind tibia hairy. Mid tibia spiny. Forewings short and broad. Costa arched towards apex. Outer margin curved outwards at centre.

Species
 Entomogramma fautrix Guenée, 1852
 Entomogramma torsa Guenée, 1852

References

External links

Catocalinae